Rubas is a rural locality (a selo) and the administrative centre of Rubassky Selsoviet, Derbentsky District, Republic of Dagestan, Russia. The population was 3,099 as of 2010. There are 44 streets.

Geography 
Rubas is located 19 km south of Derbent (the district's administrative centre) by road. Aglobi and Kommuna are the nearest rural localities.

Nationalities 
Tabasarans, Azerbaijanis, Lezgins and Aghuls live there.

References 

Rural localities in Derbentsky District